Asturias, officially the Municipality of Asturias,  is a 3rd class municipality in the province of Cebu, Philippines. According to the 2020 census, it has a population of 55,397 people.

History

The original name of Asturias is Naghalin, perhaps from the word lalin, native Cebuano term for settlers coming from far places. Other authorities say that "Naghalin" is a mispronunciation of the Cebuano word naghaling which means "making fire" as preparation for cooking. This assertion is supported by the old name of an adjacent municipality, "Bagacawa" (now known as Tuburan), which means "fiery cauldron" from the Cebuano baga (ember) and kawa (cauldron).

The first occupants of Asturias came from other places and neighboring islands such as Negros and Bohol.  At first, one part of Naghalin was part of Tuburan and the other part of Balamban. Over time, the population of Naghalin increased because of immigration and natural population growth.  Eventually the inhabitants petitioned Spain to grant them their own local government.  This petition was granted in the late 19th century by Spain, thereby creating the pueblo (region) of Asturias. This event was witnessed by the arrival in 1888 of the alférez, Antonio Alonso, uncle of José Rizal.

Geography
Asturias is bordered to the north by the town of Tuburan, to the west is the Tañon Strait, to the east is the city of Danao, and to the south is the town of Balamban.

Barangays

Asturias comprises 27 barangays, of which 7 are coastal and 20 are inland:

Climate

Demographics

Economy

References

External links
 [ Philippine Standard Geographic Code]

Municipalities of Cebu